Zaherabad (also Romanized as Z̧āherābād; also known as Z̧ohrābāb) is a village in Jolgeh Rural District Rural District, Shahrabad District, Bardaskan County, Razavi Khorasan Province, Iran. At the 2006 census, its population was 1,606, in 401 families.

References 

Populated places in Bardaskan County